The Everlasting is a role-playing game created by Steve Brown of Visionary Entertainment Studios Inc in the 1990s. The system has four core books: The Book of the Unliving (1997); The Book of the Light (1998); The Book of the Spirit (1998); and The Book of the Fantastical (2004). There are also two supplement books available for the game: The Codex of Immortals (2004); and The Magician's Companion (2004).

The Everlasting is based on several immortal races who struggle with an unknown force. Since Hiroshima and thereafter Tchernobyl, many seals are broken and "something" is coming.

These immortal races span a wide range of mythological beings from societies around the world.  Steve Brown had done extensive research on these various types of mythological beings and incorporated different ideas and concepts from the different societies that these mythologies originate from.  As an example, he included many different types of vampires from varying cultures around the world.  Among the varying creatures and beings that players can take on the roles of in this RPG are the following:
 Angels
 Daevas
 Dead Souls
 Djinn
 Dragons
 Dwarves
 Elves
 Faeries
 Gargoyles
 Ghuls
 Manitou
 Orcs
 Osirians
 Possessed
 Questers
 Reanimates
 Revenants
 Vampires
 Wer

This RPG also heavily stresses the development of each player's own personal mythology, and encourages developing a meaningful and interesting story (to a degree beyond what is seen in most paper and dice RPGs). This goes as far as referring to the characters being played by the players as "Protagonists" and any creatures or other beings and humans that they must struggle against as "Antagonists" similar to what is commonly seen in literature.

See also
 The Everlasting - Book of the Light (1998)

References

External links
 Everlasting at Pen & Paper

Fantasy role-playing games
Role-playing games introduced in 1997